Andy Moore (born 6 September 1968) is a former Wales international rugby union player. A scrum-half, he played for Wales in the 1995 Rugby World Cup finals and at the time played club rugby for Cardiff RFC.
Clubs represented: Cardiff RFC, University of Oxford, Richmond RFC, Benetton Treviso, Neath RFC, Cardiff Blues

References

Welsh rugby union players
Wales international rugby union players
Cardiff RFC players
Benetton Rugby players
Rugby union scrum-halves

Living people
1968 births